Peter Lawson may refer to:

 Peter Lawson (politician) (1821–1911), a Canadian politician in the 1860s
 Peter Lawson (composer) (born 1951), an English composer and pianist
 Peter Lawson (cricketer) (born 1981), an English cricket player
 Peter Lawson Jones (born 1952), an American politician and actor